Andrei Valentinovich Zenin (born 4 March 1991) is a Russian football player.

Club career
He made his debut in the Russian Second Division for FC Volgar Astrakhan on 16 July 2012 in a game against FC Energiya Volzhsky. He made his Russian Football National League debut for Volgar on 25 October 2014 in a game against FC Tom Tomsk.

References

External links
 

1991 births
People from Tyumen
Living people
Russian footballers
Association football midfielders
Association football forwards
FC Volgar Astrakhan players
FC Dynamo Bryansk players
Sportspeople from Tyumen Oblast